Beryllium sulfate  normally encountered as the tetrahydrate, [Be(H2O)4]SO4 is a white crystalline solid. It was first isolated in 1815 by Jons Jakob Berzelius. Beryllium sulfate may be prepared by treating an aqueous solution of many beryllium salts with sulfuric acid, followed by evaporation of the solution and crystallization. The hydrated product may be converted to anhydrous salt by heating at 400 °C.

Structure
According to X-ray crystallography the tetrahydrate contains a tetrahedral Be(OH2)42+ unit and sulfate anions. The small size of the Be2+ cation determines the number of water molecules that can be coordinated. In contrast, the analogous magnesium salt, MgSO4·6H2O contains an octahedral Mg(OH2)62+ unit. The existence of the tetrahedral [Be(OH2)4]2+ ion in aqueous solutions of beryllium nitrate and beryllium chloride  has been confirmed by vibrational spectroscopy, as indicated by the totally symmetric BeO4 mode attt 531 cm−1.  This band is absent in beryllium sulfate, and the sulfate modes are perturbed.  The data support the existence of Be(OH2)3OSO3.

The anhydrous compound has a structure similar to that of berlinite. The structure contains alternating tetrahedrally coordinated Be and S and each oxygen is 2 coordinate (Be-O-S). The Be-O distance is 156 pm and the S-O distance is 150 pm.

A mixture of beryllium and radium sulfate was used as the neutron source in the discovery of nuclear fission.

References

External links

IARC Monograph "Beryllium and Beryllium Compounds"
IPCS Health & Safety Guide 44

IPCS CICAD 32

Beryllium compounds
Sulfates